Alfriston Windmill is a tower mill at Alfriston, Sussex, England which has been converted to residential accommodation.

History

Alfriston Windmill was built in 1834. The mill was working until 1905 when a sail was damaged by a cow. The mill worked for another two years on two sails. In 1908, the mill was stripped of machinery, and had been converted into a house by 1910.

Description

Alfriston Windmill is a three-storey brick tower mill. It had four Spring sails and the beehive cap was winded by a fantail. The mill drove two pairs of underdrift millstones. All that remains today is the tower, with various additions and extensions.

Millers

Richard Saxby, 1834
Daniel Sudbury, 1845
William Shoesmith, 1855 - 1866
Thomas Harvey, 1866 - 1874
Thomas Fennell, 1881
George Hewitt, 1907

References

Further reading
  Online version

Tower mills in the United Kingdom
Grinding mills in the United Kingdom
Windmills completed in 1834
Windmills in East Sussex
Towers completed in 1834
Windmill